John Payson Soule (1828–1904) was a photographer and publisher in Boston, Massachusetts, and Seattle, Washington.

Biography
He was born in Phillips, Maine on October 19, 1828. His younger brother, William Stinson Soule, also became a photographer.

J.P. Soule maintained photographic studios on Washington Street in Boston, ca.1861-1882. As a photographer, his subjects in Boston included buildings, the 1869 National Peace Jubilee, the great fire of 1872, and carte-de-visite portraits. He also photographed mountains in New Hampshire, and the 1866 fire in Portland, Maine. He exhibited works in the Charitable Mechanic's exhibitions of 1850, and 1874 (bronze medal).

In addition to taking photographs, Soule published works by Martin M. Hazeltine and others. Crediting of photographer's original works followed rather murky standards. For instance, photographs "by John P. Soule" of natural scenery in California appeared in Samuel Kneeland's Wonders of Yosemite Valley, and of California (1871). However, "the photographs ... credited to John P. Soule on the title page ... have recently been re-attributed to the photographer Martin Mason Hazeltine.  Soule, a publisher of stereoviews, purchased many of Hazeltine's California negatives, copyrighted them in 1870, and began selling them in Boston."

Soule joined the Ancient and Honorable Artillery Company of Massachusetts in 1865, and belonged to the Freemasons.
 
After leaving Boston around 1882, he traveled west again. "In 1888, John Soule moved to Seattle, where he continued to work as a photographer. Soule photographed the aftermath of the Seattle Fire of 1889 and the rebuilding thereafter. He continued to live in Seattle and occasionally taking photographs of the growing city until his death in 1904."

References

External links

 Boston Athenaeum, works by Soule
 University of Washington, works by Soule
 WorldCat. Soule, John P.
 Yale University Library. Tip-Top House, ca.1870, by Soule. 
 Flickr. Carte-de-visite by Soule, of an unidentified man
 familystacks.com, Details of John P. Soule family.

Images

American photographers
1828 births
1904 deaths
Artists from Boston
19th century in Boston
People from Phillips, Maine